Dorset Police is the territorial police force responsible for policing the county of Dorset in the south-west of England, which includes the largely rural area covered by Dorset Council, and the urban conurbation of Bournemouth, Christchurch and Poole.

History
Dorset County Constabulary was formed in 1855. In 1965, it had an establishment of 544 and an actual strength of 466. On 1 October 1967, it merged with Bournemouth Borough Police to form Dorset and Bournemouth Constabulary.

On 1 April 1974, this force took over some areas (mainly Christchurch and its hinterland) from Hampshire Constabulary and acquired its present name of Dorset Police.

Chief constables

Dorset Constabulary 
 19241955 Peel Yates
19551962 Ronald Berry Greenwood
19621967 Arthur Hambleton

Dorset and Bournemouth Constabulary 
 19671974 Arthur Hambleton

Dorset Police 
19741980 Arthur Hambleton
19811982 David Owen
1982 1995 Brian Weight
19951998 D. W. Aldous
19992004 Jane Stichbury
20052012 Martin Baker
20122018 Debbie Simpson
20182021 James Vaughan
2021–2023 Scott Chilton
2023present Amanda Pearson

Governance
Dorset Police was formerly responsible to the Dorset Police Authority, which was replaced in 2012 by the elected Dorset Police and Crime Commissioner (PCC). , the PCC is David Sidwick, who represents the Conservative Party.

Organisation and operations
In 2022, Dorset Police received 121,798 emergency calls on 999.

In the 20182019 financial year, Dorset Police:
 Recorded 183,412 incidents, including 55,028 crimes
 Made 10,515 arrests
 Dealt with 5,832 missing persons incidents and 7,426 mental health incidents

Criminal Investigation Department 
Criminal Investigation Department (CID) provides advice to all policing units on crime-related matters and maintaining a corporate approach to reducing crime, as well as providing specialist and investigative roles. CID is split into numerous sub-departments, which include: Child Protect Investigation, Intelligence Directorate, Scientific Support.

Roads Policing Unit 
The force is responsible for policing road across the county. There are no motorways located within Dorset. Dorset Police have around 450 vehicles, from 20 different manufacturers, and drive a total of 7.5million miles a year. The Roads Policing Unit also features the following teams:

Teams within the RPU include No Excuse Team, launched in 2010, which aims to reduce deaths and serious injuries on Dorset roads;
and the Interceptor Team, launched in 2023, which targets criminals using the road network within Dorset.

Ports Policing Unit 
The Ports Policing Unit is responsible for policing all  ports in Dorset including Poole Harbour, Swanage Harbour, Portland Harbour, Weymouth Harbour, Christchurch Harbour and Bournemouth Airport.

Marine Policing Unit 
The Marine Unit is responsible for policing the 89 miles of Dorset's coastline and up to 12 miles out to sea. The area is one of the busiest coastal areas in the UK, including two of the busiest ports, numerous shipping lanes, thousands of private moorings, the RNLI's busiest callout area and a training centre for the Royal Marines.

Tactical Firearms Unit 
The Tactical Firearms Unit responds to major and serious crimes where firearms are involved.

Dog Section 
The Dog Section was established in 1953; the unit is based in Eastern Division HQ in Ferndown. The unit comprises one inspector, one sergeant, 13 constables and 22 dogs, including general purpose German Shepherds and more specialist breeds.

Air Operations Unit 
Since 2014, air support has been provided by National Police Air Service (NPAS). Its nearest helicopter is based at Bournemouth Airport and also support Devon and Cornwall, Avon and Somerset, Gloucestershire, Wiltshire, South Wales, Dyfed-Powys and Gwent..

Locations 
The force headquarters is at Winfrith. Police stations open to the public are located at Blandford, Bournemouth Central, Bridport, Gillingham, Poole, Sherborne, Swanage and Weymouth. 

Stations without a public front desk are Boscombe, Dorchester, Ferndown, Shaftesbury, Sturminster Newton, Verwood, Wareham, Wimborne and Winton.

There are two custody suites at Bournemouth Central and Weymouth Police station. 

In September 2017, the Christchurch Neighbourhood Policing Team moved to the fire station on Fairmile, further advancing the relationship with Dorset and Wiltshire Fire and Rescue Service.

Uniforms and equipment

Equipment 
Dorset Police use Motorola MTH800 TETRA digital radios, rigid handcuffs, limb restraints, telescopic batons and incapacitant spray.

Some officers use the Conducted Energy Device (CED) TASER, a non-lethal electroshock weapon used to incapacitate targets via shocks of 50,000 volts. As of 2021, there were 374 officers trained in using TASER.

Vehicles 
Previously, Dorset Police Transport Services manage the force's 450 vehicles, across its divisional units, road policing unit, and armed response. However, in 2016, Dorset's Fleet Services aligned with Devon & Cornwall's as part of a proposed force merger. As a result, there are now seven workshops available across the three counties, and Dorset manages and maintains approximately 500 vehicles as part of 'Alliance Fleet Services'.

As of 2020, Dorset Police had 429 vehicles which included 338 cars, 83 vans and 8 motorcycles.

Performance

British Crime Survey 
The British Crime Survey for 2010 found that there was an overall fall in crime in Dorset by 2.5%, and the largest fall in crime was robbery, which fell by 20%, making Dorset Police the eighth best performing force out of 43 in England and Wales, and first in forces similar to Dorset.

The performance figures from Dorset Police comparing April to December 2009 with the same period during 2008, showed a 9.9% drop in burglary, an 8.5 per cent drop in criminal damage, a 3.5 per cent fall in vehicle crime, a 3% drop in total violent crime, and a 17.8 per cent fall in the most serious violent crime. Criminal damage fell by 5.8%, violence against the person without injury by 9.3%, violence against the person by 5.2%, drug offences by 5.1% and there was a 2.8 per cent fall in total recorded crime.

According to the British Crime Survey, 63.8 per cent of people think Dorset Police deals with local concerns, making Dorset the best performing force in England and Wales for that issue.

Some 9.9% of people say there is a high level of perceived anti-social behaviour, making Dorset the eighth best performing force in England and Wales – and the top performing force among its family of five most similar forces. Some 17.6% of people said there was a big problem with drugs while 18.8 per cent of people in Dorset said there was a big problem with drunk and rowdy behaviour. 51.6% of people in Dorset agreed that the police and local councils were dealing with issues, making Dorset the twelfth best performing force in England and Wales.

Her Majesty's Inspectorate of Constabulary 
In 2010, Her Majesty's Inspectorate of Constabulary (Her Majesty's Inspectorate of Constabulary and Fire & Rescue Services since 2017) (HMICFRS) graded Dorset Police overall as 'fair' on local crime and policing, protection from serious harm, confidence and satisfaction. In detail they were graded as 'fair' at neighbourhood policing, neighbourhood presence and solving crime. They were rated as 'good' at reducing crime. They were graded 'excellent' at suppressing gun crime, suppressing knife crime, comparative satisfaction of the BME community, confidence in the police and proportion of police cost met by council. They were scored 'poor' and 'stable' on reducing road death and injury.

PEEL inspection
HMICFRS conducts a periodic police effectiveness, efficiency and legitimacy (PEEL) inspection of each police service's performance. In its latest PEEL inspection, Dorset Police was rated as follows:

Controversies
In 2006, a Dorset Police officer's use of CS gas against a Wareham gardener left him with permanent scarring. The gas canister was held inches from the man's face for a prolonged period of time. The man's family alleged that he was prevented from seeking medical care in the immediate aftermath of the incident.  It was later reported that the man pleaded guilty to interfering with the arrest of another individual when he was sprayed with the incapacitant and was sentenced to two weeks in prison.  This sentence was served concurrently with a 3 month prison sentence for three assault by beating offences which the man also admitted and was on bail for at the time of the CS incapacitant incident.

In the same year, a man who had previously been sprayed with CS gas by Dorset Police was arrested and forcibly stripped in his own home by Dorset Police officers.

In 2011, a Slovakian care worker was unlawfully detained and strip-searched in a Dorset Police station in Bournemouth. In a later settlement, Dorset Police admitted liability, and paid out damages of £4,750.

In March 2021, Police Constable Timothy Brehmer, was convicted of manslaughter for the death of his mistress and fellow colleague's wife. Having had a 10 year affair, the altercation in which he is said to have strangled the victim to death took place in a local car park, following her decision to call things off. 

In 2022 the IOPC made a number of recommendations following the disappearance of Gaia Pope, and the poor way Dorset Police handled the case.

Alliances and merger proposals
In 2006 the Home Office announced plans to reduce the number of police forces in the UK from 42 to 24. This would have seen Dorset Police merge with Gloucestershire Constabulary, Devon and Cornwall Police, Avon and Somerset Constabulary and Wiltshire Police.  The plans were publicly criticised by all the involved forces, stating that it would lead to poor quality service and a reduction in local policing. The merger plans were abandoned in August 2006 by the then Home Secretary, John Reid.

Devon and Cornwall Police and Dorset Police announced in December 2013 that their Chief Constables and PCCs were exploring opportunities for greater collaboration; to save costs without reducing service, and share assets, resources, expertise and best practice. Her Majesty's Inspectorate of Constabulary (HMIC) defines a strategic alliance as: "An agreement between two or more forces to pursue a set of agreed objectives, while retaining separate identities." A strategic alliance was agreed to in March 2015, covering over 30 administrative and operational business areas (almost 40% of the total activity of the two forces). These business areas include admin services, finance, human resources, fleet services and ICT, together with some specialist policing teams. The first joint teams became operational in April 2016. In each business area, there is a single team and management structure made up from people from both organisations, to work on behalf of both forces. Any costs and savings are shared in proportion to the size of each force. So far the strategic alliance project is on track to achieve the initial target of £12million of combined annual savings by 2018.

In September 2017, it was announced that Dorset Police and Devon and Cornwall Police were looking at merging to form a single force. This was cancelled in October 2018 when the PCC for Devon and Cornwall was unwilling to submit the merger plans to the home officer for consideration.

Officers killed in the line of duty 

The Police Roll of Honour Trust and Police Memorial Trust list and commemorate all British police officers killed in the line of duty. Since its establishment in 1984, the Police Memorial Trust has erected 50 memorials nationally to some of those officers.

Dorset Police Male Voice Choir
The Dorset Police Male Voice Choir was founded on 4 July 1995 as independent charity that today has 60 members, that perform regularly throughout Dorset. The choir has performed throughout England and also France, Guernsey, Ireland and the USA. The choir has so far raised over £250,000 for charity.

In popular culture 

 The 2006 book Bobbies on the Beat: 150 Years of the Dorset Police by Melvin Hann presents the history of the Dorset Police Force to mark the 150th anniversary.
 The 2018 book Operation Countryman: The Flawed Enquiry into London Police Corruption by former Metropolitan Police officer Kirby Dick, discusses Operation Countryman, an investigation into police corruption in London in the late 1970s, on which then Home Secretary, Merlyn Rees, appointed Dorset Police to investigate. The investigation was led by then Dorset Police Chief Constable, Arthur Hambleton, to which Dick describes in his book as 'shambolic'.
 In March 2017, an episode of The Kyle Files, presented by Jeremy Kyle, featured the No Excuse and Traffic unit. The 30-minute documentary featured Kyle joining the units on patrol, focusing on the dangers at the wheel, such as drink and drug driving, mobile phone use, speeding and Operation Dragoon, Dorset Police's approach to tackling the most dangerous road users.The episode was filmed in October 2016 and aired on ITV on 6 March 2017.
 In October 2017, Gordon Ramsay's documentary Gordon Ramsay on Cocaine, featured Ramsay joining the Traffic Unit on patrol in Bournemouth, for a special operation to tackle the issue of drug driving. The episode was filmed in April 2017 and the two-part programme aired on ITV on 19 October and 26 October 2017.

See also
Law enforcement in the United Kingdom
 List of law enforcement agencies in the United Kingdom, Crown Dependencies and British Overseas Territories

References

External links

 
 Dorset at HMICFRS
 
Dorset Police Roll of Honour

Police
Police forces of England
1855 establishments in England
Organizations established in 1855